NRZ may refer to:

 Lala language (Papua New Guinea)
 National Railways of Zimbabwe
 Neue Rheinische Zeitung, a newspaper published by Karl Marx
 Neue Ruhr Zeitung, a regional German newspaper
 Non-return-to-zero, an encoding technique.